The Vinnitsa uezd was one of the uezds (uyezds or subdivisions) of the Podolian Governorate of the Russian Empire. It was situated in the northern part of the governorate. Its administrative centre was Vinnytsia (Vinnitsa).

Demographics
At the time of the Russian Empire Census of 1897, Vinnitsky Uyezd had a population of 248,314. Of these, 74.4% spoke Ukrainian, 12.4% Yiddish, 7.1% Russian, 5.1% Polish, 0.3% Bashkir, 0.2% Tatar, 0.1% German, 0.1% Belarusian and 0.1% Czech as their native language.

References

 
Uezds of Podolia Governorate